Melitta Sollmann (born 20 August 1958 in Gotha, Thuringia) is an East German luger who competed from the late 1970s to the mid-1980s. She won the silver medal in the women's singles event at the 1980 Winter Olympics in Lake Placid, New York.

Sollmann also won three medals in the women's singles event at the FIL World Luge Championships with two golds (1979, 1981) and one silver (1983). She also won three medals in the women's singles event at the FIL European Luge Championships with two golds (1979, 1980) and one bronze (1982).

Sollmann's best overall Luge World Cup finish was third in 1982-3.

References
Fuzilogik Sports - Winter Olympic results - Women's luge
Hickoksports.com results on Olympic champions in luge and skeleton.
Hickok sports information on World champions in luge and skeleton.
Kluge, Volker. (2000). Das große Lexikon der DDR-Sportler. Berlin: Schwarzkopf & Schwarzkopf. 
List of European luge champions 
List of women's singles luge World Cup champions since 1978.
SportQuick.com information on World champions in luge 

1958 births
Living people
People from Gotha (town)
German female lugers
Lugers at the 1980 Winter Olympics
Olympic silver medalists for East Germany
Olympic lugers of East Germany
Olympic medalists in luge
National People's Army military athletes
Sportspeople from Thuringia
Medalists at the 1980 Winter Olympics
20th-century German women